The Energy Loop: Huntington/Eccles Canyons Scenic Byway is a National Scenic Byway in the state of Utah.

Route description

The route begins in Fairview at the intersection of US-89 and SR-31 following SR-31 eastward and immediately connects with the north end of SR-231. It follows the canyon for another 6–7 miles, entering the Manti-La Sal National Forest, until it climbs out of the top end of the canyon at about  altitude. From this point, the byway splits in two.

The south branch continues to follow SR-31, climbing up to over  elevation before dropping down to the east-southeast as it passes Huntington Reservoir, Cleveland Reservoir, and turning to the northeast towards Electric Lake. At this point, the route turns to the southeast, following Huntington Canyon and Huntington Creek downwards, eventually exiting the national forest and the canyon and ending in the city of Huntington, a mile southwest of Huntington State Park.

The North branch turns onto SR-264, which travels eastward towards the north end of Electric Lake, where it turns north to go up Upper Huntington Canyon. It continues on past the north end of the reservoir for a few more miles before turning to the east yet again, ending northwest of Price Canyon near Colton.

History
For the histories of this route's constituent highways prior to its scenic byway designation, refer to:
 SR-31
 SR-96
 SR-264

This route was designated a Utah Scenic Byway in 1990, a National Forest Scenic Byway on February 6, 1991 (as Huntington Canyon Scenic Byway, Eccles Canyon Scenic Byway), and a National Scenic Byway on June 15, 2000.

Major intersections

North branch

South branch

See also

 List of Utah Scenic Byways

References

External links

Utah Scenic Byways
National Scenic Byways
Energy Loop
Energy Loop
Energy Loop
Energy Loop
National Forest Scenic Byways
Tourist attractions in Carbon County, Utah
Tourist attractions in Utah County, Utah
Tourist attractions in Sanpete County, Utah
Tourist attractions in Emery County, Utah